The St. Paul Episcopal Cathedral (1852) was located on the southeast corner of Seventh and Plum Streets, in Cincinnati, Ohio. The church was across from the Saint Peter in Chains Cathedral and next to the Plum Street Temple. The original St. Paul's Episcopal Church was located at 111 East Fourth Street. The congregation was formed in 1828 by the Rev. Samuel Johnson, pastor of Christ Church. He had been unable to collect two years of back pay. He won over a sizable portion of the flock to the new church. In 1883 the church merged with St. John's Episcopal Church at Seventh and Plum Streets, which had been formed by the Rev. Nicholson in 1851. The church became the cathedral of the Episcopal Diocese of Southern Ohio.

One guidebook writes of the church, "For decades after the completion of this stately church in 1852, elegant and fashionable Cincinnatians worshiped there." The Rev. Nicholas Hamner Cobbs served this church for several years before becoming Bishop of Alabama. Salmon P. Chase was superintendent of the Sunday school.

The building was demolished in 1937. Many of its members had moved to the suburbs. Today Christ Church Cathedral on Fourth Street is the seat of the Episcopal Diocese of Southern Ohio, and the chapel in the diocesan headquarters next door (which also houses the Forward Movement) is named after St. Paul.

References

External links
 St. Paul's Church, Seventh & Plum Streets, Cincinnati
 St. Paul Cathedral
 History of Churches in Hamilton County
 Picture of the church

Paul Cincinnati
Episcopal churches in Ohio
Episcopal churches in Cincinnati
Demolished churches in Ohio
Former Episcopal church buildings in the United States
Religious organizations established in 1828
1828 establishments in Ohio
Churches completed in 1852
Buildings and structures demolished in 1937
19th-century Episcopal church buildings